This incomplete list of tunnels in Pakistan includes roads and rails etc.

Road tunnels
 Attabad Tunnels
 Abbottabad Tunnels - 1,720 m and 2,390 m
 Battal Tunnel - 2960 m (3 km)
 Karakar Tunnel - 2.1 km
 Karmong Tunnel - 442 m
 Kohat Tunnel - 1.9 km
 Lowari Tunnel - 10.4 km
 Malakand Tunnel
 Mansehra Tunnel - 2.8 km
 Nahakki Tunnel
 Pak-China Friendship Tunnel
 Quetta Tunnel
 Shinkiari Tunnel
 Simly Tunnel
 Swat Motorway Tunnels
 Zalam Kot Twin Tube Tunnel
 Thakot Tunnel - 615m

Railway tunnels
 Khojak Tunnel
 Lahore Metro Orange Line Tunnel

Hydro tunnels
 Benton Tunnel

others
 Motto Tunnel at Ayubia National Park

References

Tunnels in Pakistan
Lists of tunnels
Tunnels by country